The National Liberation Army (UÇK; , Osloboditelna narodna armija, ONA), also known as the Macedonian UÇK was a militant, separatist militia that operated in the Republic of Macedonia in 2001 and was closely associated with the Kosovo Liberation Army (KLA).

Following the 2001 Macedonian War, it was disarmed through the Ohrid Agreement, which gave greater rights and autonomy to the state's Macedonian Albanians.

Background

Ali Ahmeti organized the NLA from former KLA fighters from Kosovo and Macedonia; Albanian insurgents from Preševo, Medveđa and Bujanovac in Serbia; young Albanian radicals; nationalists from Macedonia; and foreign mercenaries. The acronym was the same as the KLA's in Albanian.

The Macedonian War

The NLA was founded in the fall of 1999 and initially led by former KLA Commander Ali Ahmeti, nephew of one of the founders of the KLA. The NLA operated quietly until it began to openly engage the Macedonian military and police. The NLA's proclaimed goal was equal rights for the ethnic Albanian minority within a confederate Macedonia. Senior NLA commanders insisted that "We do not want to endanger the stability and the territorial integrity of Macedonia, but we will fight a guerrilla war until we have won our basic rights, until we are accepted as an equal people inside Macedonia." The Macedonian government claimed the NLA were an extremist terrorist organization seeking to separate Albanian majority areas and unite those territories with Albania.

Beginning on January 22, 2001, the NLA began to carry out attacks on Macedonian security forces using light weapons. The conflict soon escalated and, by the start of March 2001, the NLA had taken effective control of a large swathe of northern and western Macedonia and had come within 12 miles of the capital Skopje.

In March 2001, NLA members failed to take the city of Tetovo in an open attack, but controlled the hills and mountains between Tetovo and Kosovo. On May 3, a Macedonian government counteroffensive failed in the Kumanovo area. By June 8, the rebels took Aračinovo, a village outside of Skopje. On August 13, the two sides signed a peace deal ending the open conflict.

Composition and military capabilities

The NLA was estimated to comprise 5,000 men at its peak and some of its members were trained by British SAS and Parachute Regiment officers. As was the case with the KLA, they were fairly lightly armed – generally with small arms and mortars – though there were later reports that they had acquired FIM-92 Stinger and SAM-7 anti-aircraft missiles. As the war progressed the rebels managed to acquire heavy weapons including T-55 tanks and armoured personnel carriers captured from Macedonian government forces.

War crimes

Although the conflict in Macedonia was brief, it was not scant of war crimes. According to Human Rights Watch, "Ethnic Albanian rebels in Macedonia tortured, sexually abused road workers after abducting them from the Skopje-Tetovo highway."

Dozens of ethnic Macedonians were kidnapped. While many were released after a short time, 12 people apparently remained missing after the NLA released 14 others in late September. In October, reports suggested that the 12 may have been killed and buried in mass graves near Neproshteno. The case was referred by the Macedonian government to the International Criminal Tribunal for the former Yugoslavia for investigation.

Another incident is the Vejce ambush, where Albanian guerrillas ambushed and killed eight Macedonian special forces from the Lions unit, a patrol of 16 special operatives. The families of the dead soldiers and several ministers claim that the information was sold to the guerrillas and that a major betrayal took place. The guerillas set up an ambush, attacking the patrol's lightly armored Humvee vehicles with small arms fire and RPGs. The patrol stopped and Macedonian forces and guerrillas exchanged fire in a short skirmish, after which the soldiers started retreating. Half of the patrol managed to escape, one soldier was shot and seven others captured and executed with knives and then their corpses were burned.

News of the massacre sparked local uprisings against Muslim Albanians in several towns and cities across Macedonia, and such revolts included burning and vandalizing shops and mosques. Surviving members of the roadside patrol that was massacred gave eyewitness testimony of the killings. They claimed that the massacre was carried out by a group of 10 bearded men. The bodies were never released to the public or civilian investigators and autopsies were carried out in a military morgue.

There was also an NLA bombing of the 13th-century Orthodox monastery Sveti Atanasij in the village of Lesok on August 21, 2001.

NATO military experts said that "the fact that the battery was lying within an area spattered by rubble and wreckage seemed to suggest that it was detonated using a relatively sophisticated timer device;". On the other hand, the Macedonian forces blew up a mosque in the town of Neprosteno. Both structures were rebuilt in 2003 with funding from the EU. The most notable incident was the infamous Asian Immigrant Massacre, when Macedonian special police forces murdered six Pakistanis and Indian citizens, thought to be connected to the NLA.

Other crimes were like that of a three-day operation by Macedonian police against the ethnic Albanian village of Ljuboten, from August 10–12, 2001, which left ten civilians dead and resulted in the arrest of more than 100 men, many of whom were severely beaten and tortured while in police custody. According to the Macedonian government there was an NLA presence in the village; however, the Human Rights Watch investigation on the ground in Ljuboten found no evidence of this and said it was a clear violation by Macedonian forces on human rights. These events led to the trial of the Macedonian Minister of Internal Affairs of the time, Ljube Boškoski, in the International War Crime Tribunal in The Hague. Eventually he was found not guilty.

Ceasefire and disarmament 

After the Ohrid Agreement, the NLA agreed to a ceasefire in June. Under the Ohrid Agreement, the Macedonian government pledged to improve the rights of the Albanian population, that make up around 20% of the population., a percentage heavily disputed by Macedonians. Those rights include making Albanian an official language, increasing the participation of ethnic Albanians in government institutions, police and the army. Most importantly, under the Ohrid Agreement, the Macedonian government agreed to a new model of decentralization.

The Albanian side agreed to give up any separatist demands and to fully recognize all Macedonian institutions. In addition, the NLA was to disarm and hand over their weapons to a NATO force.

Operation Essential Harvest was officially launched on 22 August and effectively started on 27 August. This 30-day mission was to initially involve approximately 3,500 NATO troops, a number that went up to 4,200 NATO troops and Macedonian troops, to disarm the NLA and destroy their weapons. Just hours after NATO wrapped up the operation, Ali Ahmeti told reporters attending a news conference in the rebel stronghold of Sipkovica that he was dissolving the National Liberation Army and that it was time for ethnic reconciliation.

Many members of the Albanian NLA, led by Ali Ahmeti, later formed the Democratic Union for Integration, a political party that won the majority of the Albanian votes in the 2002 election and formed part of the ruling coalition along with SDSM and LDP until August 2006 when, following July 2006 parliamentary elections, a conservative VMRO-DPMNE / DPA coalition came to government.

The total casualties of the war on each side are not known, but both sides claimed their own military casualties were around 60 each, while about 60–80 ethnic Albanian civilians and possibly about ten Macedonian civilians are thought to have been killed.

Equipment

Later developments
After the Ohrid Agreement on 26 March 2002, ANA members attacked former NLA members in the village and former NLA stronghold Mala Rečica near Tetovo. The Battle between former members of the NLA and members of the ANA lasted four hours and about 100 militants participated in it. According to some sources, 1 to 2 militants died in this skirmish.

In 2004 and 2005 a group of 80 militants led by Agim Krasniqi controlled the village of Kondovo twice. Through the media, Krasniqi threatened to shell Skopje and his men kidnapped and beat four police officers.

In 2007 a group of at least 23 militants controlled the region of the village Brodec on the Šar Mountains. The police launched Operation Mountain Storm and defeated the group.

In April 2010, a weapon cache believed to be intended for group actions was discovered near the border with Serbia; it included uniforms with UÇK marks.

The NLA claimed responsibly for the 2014 Skopje government attack. The organization, in the letter signed by "Kushtrimi" to the government, claimed that the "Hasan Prishtina" elite force hit the government building in a coordinated action. The organization claims it is dissatisfied with the 2001 Ohrid Agreement.

On 21 April 2015, a group of 40 armed men with NLA patches attacked a border police station at Gošince. The group tied the policemen up and beat them, then stole their arms and communication devices. Before they left for Kosovo, the issued the message: "We are from the National Liberation Army. Tell them that neither Ali Ahmeti nor Nikola Gruevski can save you. We do not want any framework agreement and if we see you here again, we will kill you. We want our own state."

During the Kumanovo clashes, 14 of the 22 of the belligerents killed wore uniforms with NLA insignia, according to Nikola Gruevski the armed group did not have the support of members of the Albanian minority contrary to the 2001 conflict.

See also
 Albanian nationalism in North Macedonia
 Greater Albania
 Republic of Ilirida
 Liberation Army of Chameria
 Albanian National Army

Gallery

References

Sources

External links

Chronology of the war
Battles
Battles
Macedonia's Civil War: 'Made in the USA'
Macedonia On War Footing Over Kosovo Border Provocations
November Battles, Start of War, January 2 2001
2002 attacks

Albanian militant groups
Albanian nationalism in North Macedonia
2001 insurgency in Macedonia
Organizations established in 1999
Secessionist organizations in Europe
Modern history of North Macedonia
Guerrilla organizations
Politics of North Macedonia
Political organizations based in North Macedonia
Albanian separatism
Nationalist terrorism in Europe
Paramilitary organizations based in North Macedonia
Paramilitary organizations in the Yugoslav Wars
1999 establishments in the Republic of Macedonia